The 1992 WTA Tour (officially titled 1992 Kraft General Foods World Tour after its sponsor) was the elite professional tennis circuit organized by the Women's Tennis Association (WTA) for the 1992 tennis season.

The WTA Tour is the elite tour for professional women's tennis organised by the Women's Tennis Association (WTA). The WTA Tour includes the four Grand Slam tournaments, the WTA Tour Championships and the WTA Tier I, Tier II, Tier III and Tier IV events. ITF tournaments are not part of the WTA Tour, although they award points for the WTA World Ranking.

Schedule

Key

December 1991

January

February

March

April

May

June

July

August

September

October

November

Rankings
Below are the 1992 WTA year-end rankings (November 23, 1992) in both singles and doubles competition:

See also
 1992 ATP Tour

References

 
WTA Tour
WTA Tour seasons